The 1991 Australian Individual Speedway Championship was the 1991 version of the Australian Individual Speedway Championship organised by Motorcycling Australia. The final took place on 27 January at the Arunga Park Speedway in Alice Springs in the Northern Territory. Sydney's Craig Boyce won his first Australian championship from defending champion Glenn Doyle with veteran Glyn Taylor third (both from Perth, WA). Boyce was unbeaten on the night to win his first Australian Championship.

As of 2013, this is the only time the Australian Solo Championship final has been held in the Northern Territory.

State Title Qualification

Northern Territory
 Northern Territory Championship
 17 November 1990
  Tennant Creek, Tennant Creek Speedway
 Referee:
 Qualification: The top two riders go through to the Australian Final.

Queensland
 Queensland Championship
 1 December 1990
  Mackay, Mac's Speedway
 Referee:
 Qualification: The top two riders go through to the Australian Final.

Victoria
 Victorian Championship
 23 December 1990
  Mildura, Olympic Park Speedway
 Referee:
 Qualification: The top two riders go through to the Australian Final.

Leigh Adams withdrew from the Australian Final after breaking his wrist in Adelaide on 9 January 1991. As the 3rd placed rider in the Victorian title, four time national champion Phil Crump was seeded to the Australian Final in Adams place.

New South Wales
 NSW Championship
 26 December 1990
  Newcastle, Newcastle Motordrome
 Referee:
 Qualification: The top two riders go through to the Australian Final.

Western Australia
 WA Championship
 28 December 1990
  Perth, Claremont Speedway
 Referee:
 Qualification: The top two riders go through to the Australian Final.

South Australia
 SA Championship
 29 December 1990
  Murray Bridge, Riverview Speedway
 Referee: Gavin Willson
 Qualification: The top two riders go through to the Australian Final.

Qualifying round
After a number of high-profile riders had failed to qualify for the Australian final, a special qualifying round was held at Arunga Park the week before the finals. Unfortunately the round was not well attended after it was revealed that only the top five riders would be paid travel money, prompting many (mostly NSW rider Stephen Davies who had placed 2nd and 3rd in the previous two Australian titles) to boycott the event. 
 Qualifying Round
 19 January 1991
  Alice Springs, Northern Territory - Arunga Park Speedway
 Referee:
 Qualification: The top four riders go through to the Australian Final. Fifth place takes Australian Final reserve spot.

1991 Australian Solo Championship
 Australian Championship
 27 January 1991
  Alice Springs, Northern Territory - Arunga Park Speedway
 Referee:

m – exclusion for exceeding two-minute time allowance • t – exclusion for touching the tapes • x – other exclusion • e – retired or mechanical failure • f – fell • ns – non-starter • nc – non-classify

References 

Books

See also
 Australia national speedway team
 Sport in Australia

Speedway in Australia
Australia
Individual Speedway Championship